New Plymouth is the major city of the Taranaki region on the west coast of the North Island of New Zealand. It is named after the English city of Plymouth, Devon from where the first English settlers to New Plymouth migrated. The New Plymouth District, which includes New Plymouth City and several smaller towns, is the 10th largest district (out of 67) in New Zealand, and  has a population of  – about two-thirds of the total population of the Taranaki Region and  % of New Zealand's population. This includes New Plymouth City, Waitara, Inglewood, Ōakura, Ōkato (561) and Urenui (429).

The city itself is a service centre for the region's principal economic activities including intensive pastoral activities (mainly dairy farming) as well as oil, natural gas and petrochemical exploration and production. It is also the region's financial centre as the home of the TSB Bank (formerly the Taranaki Savings Bank), the largest of the remaining non-government New Zealand-owned banks.

Notable features are the botanic garden (i.e. Pukekura Park), the critically acclaimed Len Lye Centre and Art Gallery, the  New Plymouth Coastal Walkway alongside the Tasman Sea, the Len Lye-designed  artwork known as the Wind Wand, Paritutu Rock, and views of Mount Taranaki.

New Plymouth was awarded the most liveable city (for a population between 75,000–150,000) by the International Awards for Liveable Communities in 2021. It also won multiple awards in 2008. The city was in 2010 chosen as one of two walking & cycling "Model Communities" by the government. Based on New Plymouth's already positive attitude towards cyclists and pedestrians, the city received $3.71m to invest into infrastructure and community programmes to boost walking and cycling.

It is also noted for being a coastal city with a mountain within 30 minutes drive, where residents and visitors to New Plymouth can snowboard, ski, water ski and surf all in the same day.

History

The area where New Plymouth was founded had for centuries been the home for several Māori iwi (tribes). From about 1823 the Maori began having contact with European whalers as well as traders who arrived by schooner to buy flax.

In 1828 Richard "Dicky" Barrett (1807–47) set up a trading post at Ngamotu after arriving on the trading vessel Adventure. Barrett traded with the local Māori and helped negotiate the purchase of land from them on behalf of the New Zealand Company. Settlers were selected by the Plymouth Company, which was set up to attract emigrants from the West Country of England, and which took over land initially purchased by the New Zealand Company. The first of the town's settlers arrived on the William Bryan, which anchored off the coast on 31 March 1841. A series of disputes over ownership and settlement of land developed between Māori and settlers soon after and New Plymouth became a fortified garrison town in 1860–1861 as more than 3500 Imperial soldiers, as well as local volunteers and militia, fought Māori in the First Taranaki War.

Geography

City suburbs 
From west to east

Satellite settlements
Oakura
Omata
Bell Block
Inglewood
Waitara

Climate 
New Plymouth has an oceanic climate that could be described as a moist, temperate climate. On 15 August 2011 it snowed in New Plymouth, a rare event which has been described as a once in a generation occurrence. A New Plymouth site was named the sunniest in the country in 2021, recording 2592 sunshine hours.

Governance

New Plymouth Province
The New Zealand Constitution Act 1852 created the New Plymouth Province, with a Provincial Council given jurisdiction over an area of 400,000ha. Five years later the name of the province changed to Taranaki Province. The province was abolished in 1876.

Borough/City of New Plymouth

A Town Board was formed in 1863 and in August 1876 the town was constituted as a borough. Its new status did little to overcome some outside perceptions, however. In 1876 author E. W. Payton wrote that "all the great bustling 'cities' of the colony had a patronising way of trying to snub New Plymouth, referring to it in such derogatory terms as the dullest hole in the colony ... nothing whatever to do there... I find a great liking for this 'slow, old hole' ... it is a quiet, unassuming place and has not done so much to attract immigrants and settlers by exaggerating reports, as some districts have done."

The Fitzroy Town District was merged with New Plymouth borough in August 1911; Vogeltown, Frankleigh Park and Westown were added a year later, followed by St Aubyn-Moturoa. By 1913 the town had a population of 7538. Seafront land was added in 1931 and 1941; land acquired on Omata Rd was added in 1955 and in 1960 large areas including land to the south of Paritutu, as well as Hurdon, Ferndale and Huatoki were included, as well as land straddling Mangorei Rd between the Henui Stream and Waiwakaiho River.

New Plymouth was declared a city in 1949.

New Plymouth District Council

In 1989, as a part of New Zealand-wide reorganisation of local government, New Plymouth City Council was merged with Taranaki District Council (Taranaki County Council and Waitara Borough merged in 1986), Inglewood District Council (Inglewood Borough and County merged in 1986), and Clifton County Council to form New Plymouth District Council.

Every three years the Mayor, 14 councillors and 16 community board members are elected by the New Plymouth District's enrolled voters. The full council, sub-committees and standing committees meet on a six-weekly cycle.

The Policy and Monitoring standing committees have delegated authority from the council to make final decisions on certain matters, and they make recommendations to the council on all others. The four community boards–Clifton, Waitara, Inglewood and Kaitake–as well as the subcommittees and working parties can make recommendations to the standing committees for them to consider.

The third standing committee, the Hearings Commission, is a quasi-judicial body that meets whenever a formal hearing is required–for instance, to hear submissions on a publicly notified resource consent application.

The Chief Executive (currently Craig Stevenson) and approximately 460 full-time equivalent staff provide advice and information to the elected members and the public, implement council decisions and manage the district's day-to-day operations.

This includes everything from maintaining more than 280 parks and reserves, waste water management and issuing consents and permits, through to providing libraries and other recreational services and ensuring the district's eateries meet health standards.

New Plymouth District Council's annual operating revenue for 2008/2009 is more than $188 million.

The current Mayor of New Plymouth is Neil Holdom.

Demographics

There were 22,269 households. There were 27,870 males and 29,346 females, giving a sex ratio of 0.95 males per female. The median age was 40.8 years (compared with 37.4 years nationally), with 11,220 people (19.6%) aged under 15 years, 9,831 (17.2%) aged 15 to 29, 25,251 (44.1%) aged 30 to 64, and 10,917 (19.1%) aged 65 or older.

Ethnicities were 84.9% European/Pākehā, 15.9% Māori, 2.4% Pacific peoples, 6.6% Asian, and 2.2% other ethnicities (totals add to more than 100% since people could identify with multiple ethnicities).

The proportion of people born overseas was 18.1%, compared with 27.1% nationally.

Although some people objected to giving their religion, 50.7% had no religion, 37.3% were Christian, 1.1% were Hindu, 0.7% were Muslim, 0.6% were Buddhist and 2.4% had other religions.

Of those at least 15 years old, 8,880 (19.3%) people had a bachelor or higher degree, and 8,919 (19.4%) people had no formal qualifications. The median income was $30,500, compared with $31,800 nationally. The employment status of those at least 15 was that 21,486 (46.7%) people were employed full-time, 7,098 (15.4%) were part-time, and 1,755 (3.8%) were unemployed.

Industry and utilities
Electric power was first provided in January 1906 from the Mangorei power station alongside the Waiwhakaiho River near Burgess Park. In the 1960s, the New Plymouth Power Station was initially designed to run on coal but constructed to be fuelled by natural gas or fuel oil. This is a thermal power station with a steam turbine, commenced operation in 1974 with units progressively decommissioned from 2000 with one left operating in 2008.

Companies began searching for oil on the New Plymouth coast in 1865 after small deposits of thick oil were found on the shoreline. The first commercial quantities of oil were obtained in January 1866. Exploration continued sporadically and a refinery opened in 1913. Production ceased about 1972. The city was one of the original nine towns and cities in New Zealand to be supplied with natural gas when the Kapuni gas field in South Taranaki entered production in 1970. The offshore Maui A well began production of natural gas in the late 1970s, sparking a flourishing energy and petrochemical industry. As Maui A's resources decline, new sites in Taranaki are being developed in an effort to find more commercial petrochemical reserves.

Powerco operates the local electricity and natural gas distribution networks in the city. Electricity is supplied from Transpower's national grid at two substations: Carrington Street (Brooklands) and Huirangi. Natural gas is supplied from First Gas's transmission system at a gate station in Bell Block.

Among the city's major industrial companies was Ivon Watkins-Dow, an agricultural chemicals company founded in 1944 by brothers Ivon, Harry and Dan Watkins and joined as a partner 20 years later by Dow Chemicals of Michigan. The company ran a factory at Paritutu making the herbicide 2,4,5-T. A 2005 study found that people who lived close to the Ivon Watkins-Dow plant between 1962 and 1987 were likely to have dioxin levels on average four times higher than the general public. In some groups the level was as much as seven times as high. A Public Health Medicine senior adviser has claimed that based on international findings, the residents' exposure to dioxin may cause increased rates of disease, in particular cancer. In March 2007 the Ministry of Health announced it would offer a major health support programme to anyone affected.
In April 2008 the Ministry clarified that the programme's main feature would be a free annual medical check up for those who had lived, worked or studied close to the factory.

Features and attractions

 
New Plymouth District has a reputation as an events centre, with major festivals (the annual TSB Bank Festival of Lights, Taranaki Powerco Garden Spectacular, WOMAD and the biennial Taranaki Arts Festival), sports fixtures (including international rugby, surfing, cricket and tennis matches, and the annual ITU World Cup Triathlon) and concerts (from Sir Elton John, Jack Johnson, REM, John Farnham and Fleetwood Mac).

With its rich volcanic soil, the city is well known for its gardens. Chief among them are the 52 ha Pukekura Park in the centre of the city (named a Garden of National Significance), and Pukeiti, a rhododendron garden of international significance high on the Pouakai Range.

Pukekura Park is also the home of the TSB Bank Festival of Lights, which runs for free every year from mid-December to early February. It has daytime and night time programmes of events for people of all ages, and the festival itself transforms the park into an illuminated wonderland every evening.

Next to the foreshore in the central city is Puke Ariki – the world's first purpose-built, fully integrated museum, library and information centre.

Nearby is the Govett-Brewster Art Gallery, a contemporary art museum. It includes the Len Lye Centre, a purpose-built extension to the museum that houses the collection of film maker and kinetic artist Len Lye, which opened in 2015.

The Coastal Walkway is a 13 km path that forms an expansive sea-edge promenade stretching almost the entire length of the city, from the Bell Block mouth in the east to Port Taranaki in the west. The pathway includes the iconic Te Rewa Rewa Bridge and is ideal for walking, running, cycling or skating, or simply enjoying the view of the dramatic west coast. It has won numerous awards, including the Cycle Friendly Award in 2008 for the best New Zealand cycle facility.

Centre City Shopping Centre is the only shopping mall in New Plymouth. It contains over 65 shops and services.

Awards
New Plymouth won the award for the most liveable city (for a population between 75,000-150,000) by the International Awards for Liveable Communities in 2021.

New Plymouth won the Top Town award from North and South Magazine in 2008 (judged "the best place in New Zealand to live, love, work and raise a family").

The city also won three awards at the 11th International Awards for Liveable Communities held in Dongguan, China, 6–10 November 2008:
 Whole City Gold award (population category 20,000 – 75,000)
 Criteria award for Community Sustainability
 Gold award for community project (natural) – the Coastal Walkway.

Transport 
An  railway link between New Plymouth and Waitara was completed in 1875; this later became the Waitara Branch. The next year, work began on a line south to Stratford, which was reached in 1879, followed by Hāwera in 1881. This line, known as the Marton - New Plymouth Line, was completed on 23 March 1885, and when the Wellington - Manawatu Line of the Wellington and Manawatu Railway Company was opened on 3 November 1886, a direct railway link was established to Wellington. The original routing through the centre of the town was replaced in 1907 by an alignment along the foreshore, which remains today. The New Plymouth Express passenger train began operating on this route in December 1886. In 1926, it was augmented by the Taranaki Flyer for the run between New Plymouth and Wanganui, A direct railway route to Auckland was not established until 1932, when the Stratford–Okahukura Line was completed; the next year, when the line was handed over from the Public Works Department to the New Zealand Railways Department, the New Plymouth Night Express began operating to Auckland. All carriage trains were replaced by RM class Standard and 88 seater railcars by 1956. The Wanganui service ceased in 1959; the Auckland service was truncated to terminate in Taumarunui from 1971; and the Wellington service was cancelled on 30 July 1977. On 11 February 1978, the Taumarunui railcar was replaced by a passenger train, but it was ultimately cancelled on 21 January 1983. Since this date, the only passenger trains to operate to New Plymouth have been infrequent excursions operated by railway preservation societies.

The breakwater at Ngamotu was completed in 1883, providing safe berthage for vessels, and the Moturoa wharf was completed in 1888. Port Taranaki is a critical transport link for the region and the only deep water port on the west coast of New Zealand.

In 1916 the city's electric tramway system began and petrol-powered buses began running four years later. The tramway system was closed in 1954. It was replaced by trolley buses which operated until 1967.

The first aircraft landed at the racecourse in 1920 and commercial flights began using the airport at Bell Block in June 1937. During World War II this grass airfield became RNZAF Bell Block; and was replaced in 1966 by the current tarmac airport,  NE of the old airport site.

Emergency services 
New Plymouth has two fire stations in the city with the central station a block away from the CBD. The station houses four fire appliances, including an aerial appliance, along with three specialist vehicles. New Plymouth Central Fire Station is manned by two crews (8 firefighters) 24 hours a day, 7 days a week and responds, not only to the city, but to surrounding areas if needed.
New Plymouth West Volunteer Fire Brigade is based west of the city in the suburb of Spotswood. The volunteer station houses a single appliance but is close to Port Taranaki and LPG/Gas tanks. The brigade supports New Plymouth and surrounding satellite towns.

Police stations are scattered throughout the city with the main base at a modern police station on Powderham Street. Other suburban stations are located in Fitzroy, Westown and Bell Block.

St John Ambulance supplies all ambulance services to Taranaki with their main station based at Taranaki Base Hospital.

The Taranaki Rescue Helicopter Trust provides search, rescue and patient transfer missions when required. The AgustaWestland AW109 is based at its hangar at Taranaki Base Hospital.

Port Taranaki is the home port for HMNZS Endeavour, although the ship is based at the Devonport Naval Base on Auckland's North Shore.

Education

There are schools in Fitzroy, Frankleigh Park, Hurdon, Lynmouth, Mangorei, Marfell, Merrilands, Moturoa, Spotswood, Strandon, Vogeltown, Welbourn, Westown and Brooklands. The Western Institute of Technology at Taranaki has its main campus in Welbourn.

The Boys' High School was founded in 1882, and the Girls' High School separated from it in 1914.

Francis Douglas Memorial College and Sacred Heart Girls' College, state-integrated catholic boys and girls schools (Years 7–13) respectively, while Spotswood College in the western suburbs is the only co-educational secondary school in the city.

Media

Local print media include:
 Taranaki Daily News – established in 1857
 Taranaki Midweek
 South Taranaki Star
 Stratford Press

Local radio stations:
 More FM 93.2FM – local breakfast (formerly Energy FM)
 The Hits 90FM – local day show (formerly Radio Taranaki)
 Access Radio Taranaki 104.4FM – local community programming
 The Most FM 100.4FM – local programming
 Cruize FM – online streaming only
 Hokonui Gold – local breakfast
 Newstalk ZB – local Saturday morning sports show and local break outs when required for sport and updates

Other stations run by NZME and Mediaworks are broadcast throughout Taranaki but are networked from either Auckland or Wellington.

Local television stations:
 7 Taranaki – closed down in 2007

The first transmitter at the site was commissioned in 1966, relaying Wellington's WNTV1 channel (now part of TVNZ 1). Today, digital terrestrial television (Freeview) is available in the city from the Mount Taranaki transmitter.

Notable people

Academia 

 Zena Daysh (1914–2011), influential in the human ecology movement, founder of the Commonwealth Human Ecology Council
 David Gauld (1942–present), president of the New Zealand Mathematical Society 1981–82
 Leila Hurle (1901–1989), schoolteacher, schools inspector
 Michael Kelly (1949–present), Prince Philip Professor of Technology, University of Cambridge
 Professor Emeritus David Penny (1939–present), third New Zealander to be named a National Academy of Sciences foreign associate
 Harry Skinner (1886–1978), soldier, ethnologist, university lecturer, museum curator and director, librarian; the H.D. Skinner Annex of the Otago Museum, was opened in August 2013, and named in honour of Skinner
 William Skinner (1857–1946), surveyor, historian, and ethnographer; founder of Puke Ariki, co-founder of the Polynesian Society
 Beatrice Tinsley (1941–1981), astronomer and cosmologist
 Neil Waters (1931–2018), inorganic chemist, academic administrator, served as vice-chancellor of Massey University (1983–1995)

Arts

Cartoon 

 Maurice Bramley (1898–1975), cartoonist and commercial artist
 Keith Waite (1927–2014), editorial cartoonist, referred to as one of the 'greatest-ever social and political cartoonists' in Britain

Film 

 Melanie Lynskey (1977–present), actress
 Anthony McCarten (1961–present), author, playwright and screenwriter
 John O'Shea (1920–2001), director, producer, writer and actor, produced the only three feature films that were made in New Zealand between 1940 and 1970
 Jared Turner (1978–present), actor

Music 

 Hayden Chisholm (1975–present), saxophonist and multi-instrumentalist
 Graeme Jefferies, musician
 Peter Jefferies, musician
 Midge Marsden (1945–present), blues and R&B guitarist, harmonica-player, and singer
 Wayne Mason (1949–present), musician
 Desna Sisarich (1946–present), pop singer, one of New Zealand's first woman singer/songwriters
 Matt Thomas (1973–present), musician
 Stan Walker (1990–present), Australian Idol winner

Photography 
 Trent Keegan (1974–2008), photojournalist

Performing arts 

 Stuart Hoar (1957–present), playwright, teacher, novelist, radio dramatist and librettist
Brian McNeill (born 1939), playwright, actor, and director

Visual arts 

 Barry Brickell (1935–2016),  potter, writer, conservationist and founder of Driving Creek Railway
 Dale Copeland (1943–present), collage and assemblage artist
 Joan Dukes (1903–1993), artist and illustrator
 Christine Hellyar (1947–present), artist who makes sculptures and installations
 Michael Smither (1939–present), painter and composer, set the record for the most expensive painting sold that was painted by a living New Zealand artist
 Francis Upritchard (1976–present), contemporary artist based in London, she represented New Zealand at the Venice Biennale

Writing 

 Helen Brown (1945–present), author and columnist
 John Guthrie (1905–1955), journalist and novelist
 Michele Leggott (1956–present), poet, academic
 Ian Middleton (1927–2007), novelist

Broadcasting 

 Daisy Basham (1879–1963), radio personality
 Mark Crysell (1961–present), former TVNZ Europe correspondent and current Sunday reporter
 Patrick Gower (1976/1977–present), journalist and National Correspondent for Newshub
 Jim Hickey (1949–present), weather presenter
 Derryn Hinch (1944–present), Australian media personality, politician, actor, journalist and author, best known for his work on Melbourne radio and television. He served as a Senator for Victoria from 2016 to 2019.
 Marama Martin (1930–2017), television and radio broadcaster. She was the first person seen on colour television in New Zealand, and was the last person to appear on NZBC TV
 Denzil Meuli (1926–2019), writer, former newspaper editor, Roman Catholic priest of the Diocese of Auckland and a leading traditionalist Catholic in New Zealand
 John McBeth (1944–present), author and journalist
 Toni Street (1983–present), television presenter and sports commentator

Business 
 Tim Besley (1927–present), engineer, businessman and former senior public servant
 Trish Gregory, fashion designer and businesswoman
 Newton King (1855–1927), auctioneer, merchant and businessman. One of the founders of the Crown Dairy Company. By 1897, it was New Zealand second largest dairy product company.

Charity 

 Sir Frederic Truby King (1958–1938), founder of the Plunket Society

Defence 

 Evelyn Brooke (1879–1962), civilian and military nurse, served during the First World War and was the only New Zealand nurse to receive the Royal Red Cross and Bar
 Tony Parr (1955–present), former Chief of the Royal New Zealand Navy Rear Admiral
 Bert Wipiti (1922–1943), fighter pilot and flying ace of the Second World War, first Māori airman to leave New Zealand for active duty

Horticulture 

 William Douglas Cook (1884–1967), founder of Eastwoodhill Arboretum, now the national arboretum of New Zealand; one of the founders of Pukeiti, a rhododendron garden

Law 

 Peter Quilliam (1920–2004), Chief Justice of the Cook Islands, judge of the High Court of New Zealand
 John Edwards, UK Information Commissioner

Politics

Activism 

 Ruth Atkinson (1861–1927), president of the Woman's Christian Temperance Union (1910–1927), activist involved in the Temperance movement and women's rights movement
 Dame Stella Casey (1924–2000), campaigner for social issues
 Te Huirangi Waikerepuru (1929–2020), Māori language activist and trade unionist, was active in the foundation and governance of Māori language radio and television

Local government 

 Harry Barker (1898–1994), Mayor of Gisborne for 27 years (1950–1977)
 John 'Horse' McLeod, New Plymouth District councillor (2007–2014) and television personality, host of Celebrity Treasure Island 2, panel member for How's Life, Treasure Islands: Extreme winner, appeared on Kiwi Living.

New Zealand Parliament 

 Arthur Atkinson (1863–1935), MP for City of Wellington (1899–1902), Wellington City Councillor (1909–1921)
 Bruce Beetham (1936–1997), leader of the Social Credit Political League, Mayor of Hamilton (1976 -1977), MP for Rangitīkei (1978–1981)
 Cam Calder (1952–present), MP (2009–2014), president of the French New Zealand Business Council
 Ken Comber (1939–1998), MP for Wellington Central (1972–1981)
 Frederic Carrington (1807–1901), politician and surveyor. He is regarded as the Father of New Plymouth
 Liz Craig (1967–present), current MP (2017–present)
 Harry Duynhoven (1955–present), former Mayor of New Plymouth (2010–2013), MP for New Plymouth (1987–1990), current New Plymouth councillor (2015–present)
 Ida Gaskin (1919–2016), Labour Party candidate for New Plymouth, Mastermind winner
 Roy Jack (1914–1977), Speaker of the House of Representatives (1967–1972); Minister of Justice (1972); MP for Patea (1954–1963), Waimarino (1963–1972), Rangitīkei (1972–1977)
 Steven Joyce (1963–present), founder of MediaWorks New Zealand, Member of Parliament (2008–2018), Cabinet Minister (2008–2017)
 Andrew Little (1965–present), former leader of the Labour Party (2014–2017), current Member of Parliament (2011–present), current Cabinet Minister (2017–present)
 Gervan McMillan (1904–1951), MP for Dunedin West (1935–1943), Dunedin City Councillor (1935 – 1941, 1944 – 1947, 1950 – 1951)
 Debbie Ngarewa-Packer (1966/1967–present), MP (2020–present), co-leader of the Māori Party
 Maryan Street (1955–present), 29th president of the Labour Party (1993–1995), Minister of ACC (2007–2008), Minister of Housing (2007–2008), MP (2005–2014), first openly gay female Member of Parliament
 Merv Wellington (1940–2003), MP for Manurewa (1975–1978) and Papakura (1978–1990)

Party politics 

 Claude Weston (1879–1946), effectively the first president of the National Party (1936–1940)

Religion 

 Emma Jane Richmond (1845–1921), community and religious worker, pioneer of anthroposophy in New Zealand

Sports

Athletics 
 Michael Aish (1976–present), athlete

Cricket 
Gary Robertson, NZ Fast Bowler
Stephen Robertson, NZ Cricketer
Mike Sandle, Black Caps manager
 Will Young (1992–present), Black Caps batsman

Rugby 
Lachlan Boshier (1994–present), rugby union player
Beauden Barrett (1991–present), rugby union player
Jordie Barrett (1997–present), rugby union player
Kane Barrett (1990–present), rugby union player
Scott Barrett (1993–present), rugby union player
Michaela Blyde (1995–present), rugby sevens player
Shane Cleaver (1987–present), rugby union player
Kendra Cocksedge (1988–present), rugby union player and cricketer
Liam Coltman (1990–present), rugby union player
Grant Fox (1962–present), rugby union player
Scott Fuglistaller (1987–present), rugby union player
Du'Plessis Kirifi (1997–present), rugby union player
Deacon Manu (1979–present), rugby union player
John Mitchell (1964–present), rugby union coach and former player
Leon Power (1986–present), rugby union player
Ricky Riccitelli (1995–present), rugby union player
Conrad Smith (1981–present), rugby union coach and former player
Willie Talau (1976–present), rugby league footballer
Paul Tito (1978–present), rugby union player
Roger Urbahn (1934–1984), rugby union player
Teihorangi Walden (1993–present), rugby union player
Paul Williams (1985–present), rugby union referee

Soccer 
Frank van Hattum (1958–present), international football player
Frank Albrechtsen (1932 - 2021), international football player

Surfing 
Paige Hareb (1990–present), professional surfer

Other 
Charles Armitage Brown (1787–1842), close friend of the poet John Keats, as well as being a friend of artist Joseph Severn, Leigh Hunt, Thomas Jefferson Hogg, Walter Savage Landor and Edward John Trelawny. He was the father of Charles Brown, a pioneer and politician of New Plymouth.

Sister cities
  Kunming, Yunnan, China
  Mishima, Shizuoka, Japan

See also
 Mayor of New Plymouth

References

Further reading

External links

 New Plymouth
 Puke Ariki: Taranaki's combined museum, library and visitor information centre
 New Plymouth Street Map 

 
New Plymouth District
Populated places in Taranaki
Port cities in New Zealand
Populated places established in 1841
Surfing locations in New Zealand
Former provincial capitals of New Zealand
1841 establishments in New Zealand